Murderball may refer to:
Murderball (sport), the original name for wheelchair rugby (known in the U.S. as quad rugby)
Murderball (film), a 2005 documentary about wheelchair rugby co-directed by Henry Rubin and Dana Adam Shapiro
Murderball, a character in the film The Violent Kind

See also
 Killerball (sport)
 Killerball (1989 videogame)